The Hungarian People's Party (PPM) was a political party in Romania.

History
The party ran in alliance with the National Peasants' Party in the 1928 general elections. The alliance won 348 seats in the Chamber of Deputies, of which the PPM took two.

Electoral history

Legislative elections

References

Defunct political parties in Romania
Hungarian political parties in Romania